Samuel Bayley (November 1878 – after 1899) was an English professional footballer who played in the Football League for Small Heath.

Bayley was born in Rugby, Warwickshire, and played for St Saviour's, Rugby and Leamington Town before joining Small Heath in 1899. An inside forward, he made his debut in the Second Division on New Year's Day 1900 in a home game against Middlesbrough which Small Heath won 5–1. Bayley scored one goal and contributed to two others, but never played for the club again, and left soon afterwards to return to Leamington. He died in Coventry, Warwickshire.

References

1878 births
Year of death missing
Sportspeople from Rugby, Warwickshire
English footballers
Association football inside forwards
Leamington F.C. players
Birmingham City F.C. players
English Football League players